Ognevia sergii is a species of spur-throated grasshopper in the family Acrididae. It is found in eastern Asia.

References

Melanoplinae
Orthoptera of Asia
Insects described in 1911